"Welterusten, meneer de president" is a 1966 Dutch-language Dylanesque protest song, sung by Boudewijn de Groot. Like most of his other songs, it was co-written by  songwriter Lennaert Nijgh. The music was composed by Boudewijn de Groot himself. The song is a protest against the war in Vietnam and the US president of the time, Lyndon B. Johnson and solidified De Groot as a protest singer.

See also
List of anti-war songs

External links
Homepage Boudewijn de Groot

Dutch pop songs
1966 songs
Dutch-language songs
Anti-war songs
Political songs
Protest songs
Songs about sleep
Songs about presidents of the United States
Cultural depictions of Lyndon B. Johnson